Luís Miguel da Costa Lobo (born 9 October 1979), known as Luís Miguel, is a Portuguese retired footballer who played mainly as a forward.

Club career
Born in Guimarães, Luís Miguel spent his entire career in Portugal with modest teams: Pevidém SC, F.C. Tirsense, Clube Caçadores das Taipas, SC Mirandela, F.C. da Madalena, Moreirense FC, Gondomar S.C. and Académico de Viseu FC. In his country, he never competed in higher than the third division.

Miguel also played in Spain with CF Extremadura (only represented the reserves), and Cyprus (APOP Kinyras FC, Enosis Neon Paralimni FC). On 26 October 2004, whilst at the service of Madalena, he scored a hat-trick against Primeira Liga club U.D. Leiria in a Taça de Portugal tie, but in a 3–4 home defeat.

References

External links

1979 births
Living people
Sportspeople from Guimarães
Portuguese footballers
Association football forwards
Segunda Divisão players
Pevidém S.C. players
F.C. Tirsense players
Clube Caçadores das Taipas players
SC Mirandela players
Moreirense F.C. players
Gondomar S.C. players
Académico de Viseu F.C. players
CF Extremadura footballers
Cypriot First Division players
APOP Kinyras FC players
Enosis Neon Paralimni FC players
Portuguese expatriate footballers
Expatriate footballers in Spain
Expatriate footballers in Cyprus
Portuguese expatriate sportspeople in Spain
Portuguese expatriate sportspeople in Cyprus